Madracis is a genus of cnidarians belonging to the family Pocilloporidae. The genus has a cosmopolitan distribution.

Description 
Madracis contains deep water azooxanthellate colonial species. They have a diverse array of growth forms, including fragile branching, dense ramose coralla, massive columnar, nodular and encrusting forms.

Species
The following species are recognised:

Madracis asanoi 
Madracis asperula 
Madracis auretenra 
Madracis brueggemanni (Ridley, 1881)
Madracis carmabi Vermeij, Diekmann & Bak, 2003
† Madracis crescentensis Durham, 1942 
Madracis decactis (Lyman, 1859)
† Madracis densa Budd, 1992 
† Madracis dodecachora Squires, 1958 
† Madracis duncani Wells, 1945 
Madracis formosa Wells, 1973
Madracis fragilis Neves & Johnsson, 2009
† Madracis ganei Vaughan, 1900 
† Madracis gregorioi Vaughan, 1900
Madracis hellana Milne Edwards & Haime, 1850
† Madracis herrecki Wells, 1934
Madracis interjecta Marenzeller, 1907
† Madracis johnsoni Vaughan, 1900
† Madracis johnwellsi Frost & Langenheim, 1974 
Madracis kauaiensis Vaughan, 1907
Madracis kirbyi Veron & Pichon, 1976
Madracis myriaster (Milne Edwards & Haime, 1850)
Madracis pharensis (Heller, 1868)
Madracis profunda Zibrowius, 1980
† Madracis senaria Wells, 1973
† Madracis stewarti Durham, 1942
† Madracis vaughani Wells, 1941

References

Pocilloporidae
Scleractinia genera